Dyshidrosis is a type of dermatitis that is characterized by itchy blisters on the palms of the hands and bottoms of the feet. Blisters are generally one to two millimeters in size and heal over three weeks. However, they often recur. Redness is not usually present. Repeated attacks may result in fissures and skin thickening.

The cause is unknown. Triggers may include allergens, physical or mental stress, frequent hand washing, or metals. Diagnosis is typically based on what it looks like and the symptoms. Allergy testing and culture may be done to rule out other problems. Other conditions that produce similar symptoms include pustular psoriasis and scabies.

Avoiding triggers may be useful, as may a barrier cream. Treatment is generally with steroid cream. High strength steroid creams may be required for the first week or two. Antihistamines may be used to help with the itch. If this is not effective steroid pills, tacrolimus, or psoralen plus ultraviolet A (PUVA) may be tried.

About 1 in 2,000 people are affected in Sweden. Males and females appear to be affected equally. It explains about one in five cases of hand dermatitis. The first description was in 1873. The name comes from the word "dyshidrotic", meaning "difficult sweating", as problems with sweating was once believed to be the cause.

Signs and symptoms
Dyshidrosis has been described as having the following characteristics:
 Itchiness of the palms or soles, followed by the sudden development of intensely itchy small blisters on the sides of the fingers, the palms or the feet.
 These blisters are often described as having a "tapioca pudding" appearance.
 After a few weeks, the small blisters eventually disappear as the top layer of skin falls off.
 These eruptions do not occur elsewhere on the body.
 The eruptions may be symmetrical.

Causes
The exact causes of dyshidrosis are unknown. Food allergens may be involved in certain cases. Cases studies have implicated a wide range of foods including tuna, tomato, pineapple, chocolate, coffee, and spices among others. A number of studies have implicated balsam of Peru. A 2013 study found that dyshydrosis on the hands increased among those allergic to house dust mites, following inhalation of house dust mite allergen.

Id reaction and irritant contact dermatitis are possible causes.

Diagnosis 
Dyshidrosis is diagnosed clinically, by gathering a patient's history and making careful observations (see signs and symptoms section). Severity of symptoms can also be assessed using the dyshidrotic eczema area and severity index (DASI). The DASI has been designed for clinical trials and is not typically used in practice.

Treatment 
There are many treatments available for dyshidrosis.  However, few of them have been developed or tested specifically on the condition.
 Barriers to moisture and irritants, including barrier creams and gloves.
 Topical steroids – while useful, can be dangerous long-term due to the skin-thinning side-effects, which are particularly troublesome in the context of hand dyshidrosis, due to the amount of toxins and bacteria the hands typically come in contact with.
 Potassium permanganate dilute solution soaks – also popular, and used to 'dry out' the vesicles, and kill off superficial Staphylococcus aureus, but it can also be very painful. Undiluted it may cause significant burning.
 Dapsone (diamino-diphenyl sulfone), an antibacterial, has been recommended for the treatment of dyshidrosis in some chronic cases.
 Antihistamines: Fexofenadine up to 180 mg per day.
 Alitretinoin (9-cis-retinoic acid) has been approved for prescription in the UK. It is specifically used for chronic hand and foot eczema. It is made by Basilea of Switzerland (BAL 4079).
 Systemic steroids can be taken orally to treat especially acute and severe cases of dyshidrosis.

Epidemiology 
About 1 in 2,000 people are affected in Sweden. Males and females appear to be affected equally.

Synonyms
Dyshidrosis is also known as pompholyx, a term originating from the Greek word for "bubble".

See also
 Dermatitis herpetiformis – a similar condition caused by celiac and often mistaken for dyshidrosis.
 Epidermolysis bullosa – a genetic disorder that causes similar, albeit more severe, symptoms to those of dyshidrosis.

References

External links 

Pompholyx at DermNet NZ (New Zealand Dermatological Society Incorporated)

Eczema
Wikipedia medicine articles ready to translate
Wikipedia emergency medicine articles ready to translate